The men's road race at the 1933 UCI Road World Championships was the seventh edition of the event. The race took place on Monday 14 August 1933 in Montlhéry, France. The race was won by Georges Speicher of France.

Final classification

References

Men's Road Race
UCI Road World Championships – Men's road race